Meole Brace, sometimes known locally as simply Meole   (pronounced like meal), is a south-western suburb of Shrewsbury, Shropshire, England.

The Rea Brook, a tributary of the River Severn, flows through the area. The brook was in the past known as the "Meole Brook".

Meole Village is the name used locally for the older part of Meole Brace, which was originally a village outside Shrewsbury. It still retains a village feel, though it is surrounded by newer urban development. This older settlement lies on the route of a Roman road and could be older than the town of Shrewsbury. There are two estates, Radbrook and a privately owned estate near the retail park.

Nearby are the small villages of Nobold and Pulley.

Etymology
The name Meole Brace comes from the old Saxon manor house, which no longer stands, owned by the Brace family (perhaps originally 'de Bracey': Norman barons). It has been known as Meole, or Mole, or Mill for almost 1000 years; it may come from Mill, as in flour mill, as there was certainly a mill on the brook, or possibly from the Welsh 'moel' meaning "bare", or by extension "bare hill" - or from Old English mele, "meal" as in "oatmeal", referring to the sediment in the brook giving a "mealy" appearance. This last etymology is supported by most of the earlier (Middle English) spellings which have "Mele" without an "o"; 'Malvern', derived from the Welsh moel, appears as mal- or mael- while Old English myll "mill" only appears with an e in southeastern (mostly Kentish) texts.

Amenities 

A5112 (Hereford Road), formerly the A49, is the main road running north–south. There is a large retail park in Meole Brace, with several leading retailers, including Sports Direct, Halfords, Argos, Marks & Spencer, Next, Currys PC World and TK Maxx. There is also a McDonald's and Pizza Hut restaurant, a Costa café and a Sainsbury's supermarket. The Welsh Marches and Cambrian railway lines run through the area, but there is no longer a railway station here.

There is a local comprehensive secondary school, Meole Brace School, and in the heart of the village there is a Church of England primary school and nursery.

The village also has a church, Holy Trinity Meole Brace (part of Trinity Churches). Built at a cost of £7500 on the site of the old vicarage, the present building was consecrated by the Bishop of Hereford in 1869 and is a Grade II* listed building.  The parish is now in the Church of England Diocese of Lichfield.  Phillip John Cansdale is the Vicar.

Sports
Meole Brace is home to Meole Brace Bowling Club, built in 1934, and to the council-run 12-hole Meole Brace Municipal Golf Course whose professional is award-winning Class AA PGA Pro, Will Shakespeare who offers a full range of professional golf services to all visitors and members. The course links the village to the nearby settlements of Reabrook and Sutton Park as well as Reabrook Nature Reserve.

The suburb has a sunday league football club, AFC Meole Brace, who currently compete in the Shrewsbury & District Sunday League. They play home games at Church Road.

New Meadow (aka Montgomery Waters Meadow), the home ground of Shrewsbury Town F.C., is located within the suburb.

Notable residents

Thomas Barker (fishing guide) (fl.1591-1651), author of The Arte of Angling, was born at Meole Brace, then called by him Bracemeol.
Edward Bather (1779-1847), later Archdeacon of Salop, was Vicar of Meole Brace from 1804 until his death there.
Thomas Bucknall Lloyd (1824-1896), later Archdeacon of Salop, was Vicar of Meole Brace 1851–1854.
Lucy Elizabeth Bather (1830-1864), writer for children as 'Aunt Lucy', lived at Meole Brace from her marriage in 1860 and died at Meole Brace Hall.
Henry Bather (1832-1905), later Archdeacon of Ludlow, was Vicar of Meole Brace 1858–97.
James Cosmo Melvill (naturalist) (1845-1929) lived at Meole Brace Hall from 1904 to his death.
William Bather (1861-1939) born at Meole Brace, first-class cricketer, later clergyman who was Vicar of Meole Brace 1897-1930.
Mary Webb (1881-1927), poet and novelist, lived at Meole Brace from 1902 to her marriage in 1912.
Lady Joan Dunn (1918-2018), one of first women to work for MI6, died a resident at Maesbrook care home in Meole Brace.

Literature
Meole Brace is mentioned in The Cadfael Chronicles.

References

External links 
Local guide
Archaeology found at Meole Brace
GENUKI(tm) page
Photos of Meole Brace and surrounding area on geograph.org.uk

Suburbs of Shrewsbury